Ceraurinium is a genus of trilobites in the order Phacopida that existed during the upper Ordovician of what is now Poland. It was described by Pribyl and Vanek in 1985, and the type species is Ceraurinium intermedius, which was originally described under the genus Ceraurus by Kielan in 1955. It was described from the Holy Cross Mountains.

References

External links
 Ceraurinium at the Paleobiology Database

Fossils of Poland
Fossil taxa described in 1985
Cheiruridae
Phacopida genera